Abraham Mountain is a  mountain summit located in the North Saskatchewan River valley of the Canadian Rockies of Alberta, Canada. Its nearest higher peak is Allstones Peak,  to the west. Abraham Mountain can be seen from David Thompson Highway and Abraham Lake. Precipitation runoff from Abraham Mountain drains east into Abraham Lake.

History
 
Like the lake, the mountain was named for Silas Abraham (1871–1961), a Stoney Indian inhabitant of the Kootenay Plains and Saskatchewan River valley, who was employed by Mary Schäffer as her guide during her 1906 and 1907 explorations. He also guided Martin Nordegg.

Geology

Abraham Mountain is composed of sedimentary rock laid down from the Precambrian to Jurassic periods that was pushed east and over the top of younger rock during the Laramide orogeny.

Climate

Based on the Köppen climate classification, Abraham Mountain is located in a subarctic climate zone with cold, snowy winters, and mild summers.

See also

Geology of the Rocky Mountains
Geography of Alberta

References

Gallery

Two-thousanders of Alberta
Canadian Rockies